Aspergillus capensis is a species of fungus in the genus Aspergillus. It is from the Flavipedes section. The species was first described in 2014.

Growth and morphology

A. capensis has been cultivated on both Czapek yeast extract agar (CYA) plates and Malt Extract Agar Oxoid® (MEAOX) plates. The growth morphology of the colonies can be seen in the pictures below.

References 

capensis
Fungi described in 2014